Telus Mobility (normally typeset as TELUS Mobility) is a Canadian wireless network operator and a division of Telus Communications which sells wireless services in Canada on its numerous networks. It operates 5G, LTE and HSPA+ on its mainstream networks. Telus Mobility is the second-largest wireless carrier in Canada, with 10.6 million subscribers as of Q3 2020.

Since 2008, Telus has operated a flanker brand named Koodo Mobile, which is targeted at high school, college and university students.

History

1980s 
In 1983, AGT Mobility was formed by Alberta Government Telephones (the predecessor to Telus) to provide a 1G analogue mobile network for Alberta's natural resources industries. It was the first mobile phone network in Canada. Analogue services became available to the general public in 1986.

1990s 
In 1992, AGT launched North America's first digital mobile network. Following the merger of Telus with BC Tel in 1999, Telus Mobility expanded its coverage to British Columbia. The company's website went online on October 14, 1999. The following year, Telus acquired Clearnet Communications and QuébecTel to expand its coverage to the central provinces. All these acquisitions, along with a tower-sharing agreement with then-primarily Eastern Canada based Bell Mobility, allowed Telus Mobility to offer its CDMA network in all Canadian provinces. Bell and Telus continued their partnership for future network construction.

2000s 
In 2007, Telus Mobility launched mobile virtual network operator (MVNO) Amp'd Mobile Canada, but replaced it in 2008 with Koodo Mobile

In February 2008, Telus Mobility discontinued its AMPS analog network, and launched its HSPA+ network in November 2009. Telus offered landlines to customers affected by the AMPS network's shutdown in rural areas, as digital signals are less reliable than analog ones in such areas. Following both events, Telus began a slow phasing out of CDMA devices, especially those that support both AMPS and CDMA technologies.

2010s 
In February 2012, Telus launched its LTE network and it stopped selling CDMA devices, except those on clearance.

In 2013, Telus was approved by the Canadian government to purchase independent wireless carrier Public Mobile.

On August 8, 2014, Telus shut down Public Mobile's CDMA network after informing customers that they would need to buy phones compatible with Telus' network.

On March 31, 2015, Telus shut down its pager network.

On January 29, 2016, Telus shut down its Mike iDEN network.

On May 31, 2017, Telus shut down its CDMA network.

Networks 
Telus Mobility partners with Bell Mobility to operate three different kinds of nationwide networks in Canada.  These networks include a UMTS network, an LTE network and a 5G network. Telus has the fastest mobile network in Canada as of 2020 according to Speedtest.net.

UMTS 
On November 5, 2009, Telus launched HSPA+ services the day after Bell launched the services on their network; much of the 3G infrastructure is shared between the two carriers. This network operates on the frequencies of 850/1900 MHz.

Telus' single-channel 21 Mbit/s HSPA+ network is available to 97% of the Canadian population. About 70% of the Canadian population are located in Telus' 42 Mbit/s dual-channel coverage areas.

Telus' HSPA+ network coverage is in portions of all Canadian provinces and territories, but it is not possible to drive in Canada between the Pacific coast and the Atlantic coast without going through areas without any cellular coverage, as there are gaps in cellular coverage in British Columbia and Ontario.

LTE 
LTE service for Telus launched on February 10, 2012 through a partnership with Bell. Telus advertises this network as having download speeds of up to 110 Mbit/s and its LTE Advanced network as having download speeds up to 225 Mbit/s.

As of August 2016, LTE coverage reaches most of Canada's population, but there are gaps in coverage in smaller communities and between communities, where TELUS' HSPA+ network is available, but its LTE network is not available.   Steinbach, MB (population 13,500) is the largest Canadian community without LTE coverage from TELUS.  Except near Canada's largest metropolitan areas, contiguous LTE coverage does not exist between communities.

Bell Mobility, which shares towers and coverage with Telus, intends to expand LTE coverage to 98% of the Canadian population by the end of 2016. As a consequence, Telus' coverage will similarly expand.  In April 2015, Telus announced that all of its wireless sites in British Columbia and Alberta will be upgraded to LTE. According to Telus, as of March 31, 2016, it had LTE coverage available 97% of the Canadian population and LTE Advance coverage available to 50% of the Canadian population.

In May 2016, Telus announced that by the end of the year, it would expand its coverage to 99% of British Columbians and expand its LTE coverage to 98% of British Columbians, expand its LTE coverage to 99% of Albertans, and expand its LTE coverage to 99% of Ontarians.

On April 18, 2016, Telus launched Voice over LTE (VoLTE).  VoLTE is supported throughout Canada.

Radio frequency summary

Products 
Telus' product lineup mainly consists of smartphones but also includes a few feature phones.  As of July 2017, smartphones are currently sold with either Android or iOS operating systems preloaded.

Telus also sells several mobile broadband modems for use with its mobile broadband service.  All modems currently sold support HSPA+ and LTE, and can connect to a personal computer via a Universal Serial Bus (USB) port, while some also provide Internet access to multiple devices via Wi-Fi and thus do not require a wired connection.

In many areas of Alberta and British Columbia, Telus offers an LTE/HSPA+ internet service for stationary use in homes or businesses in rural areas where wired service is unavailable.  This service uses an LTE router which provides WIFI and LAN connectivity.  The router can be purchased outright, or it can be paid for with 24 equal payments added to the bill over two years.  The payments which would be over $11.00 are rounded down to $10 per month.

Services

Voice 
Telus Mobility sells a variety of voice plans.  These include a fixed number of minutes plus unlimited calling on weeknights, weekends and with up to four other Telus lines on the same account.  Caller ID and a basic voicemail for up to three messages are also included as calling features, although airtime is charged for accessing the latter.  All voice plans except for the least expensive one also allow the choice of one additional feature: double minutes, five favourite numbers or unlimited Canada-wide SMS/MMS messaging.  For the five favourite numbers, unlimited calling is available in either local or Canada-wide options while messaging to these numbers is Canada-wide.

Partners Skype and Telehop offer long distance services for Telus Mobility customers.  The first service uses Voice over IP (VoIP) and requires a mobile broadband connection, while the latter uses traditional telephony through the dialing code No. 100.  The Telehop service, which deducts minutes when used during weekdays, cannot be use for calls terminating in Canada or the United States.

Mobile Internet 
Telus offers several Internet-only and smartphone plans and add-ons for customers wishing to access mobile broadband.  Only one plan can be added per device, and certain plans are only available for certain devices.

Mobile payment 

Telus Mobility postpaid customers with a compatible smartphone can subscribe to Skype (and formerly also Rdio) and be billed for the service on their monthly bill.  Use of either service on the Telus Mobility network requires a subscription to one of the provider's data plans or add-ons.

Controversy

Sale of pornography 
In 2007, Telus Mobility began selling in-house pay-per-download pornographic entertainment, including explicit pictures and videos, via its phones. Industry analysts described the action, the first by a North American wireless company, as a landmark move. However, the company later discontinued sales of such content in response to objections from religious groups.

Incoming text message fee 
In July 2008, Telus Mobility and Bell Mobility simultaneously introduced charges of 15¢ for every incoming text message received by all customers not subscribed to a text messaging plan. Critics were quick to point out that there is no way of blocking incoming message fees and suggested Telus and Bell were price fixing as both had announced the fees simultaneously. Both companies have been sued by frustrated consumers and subscribers, as they demand change in text charges. Many customers were frustrated because this fee also applies to existing customers with ongoing contracts. As of 2014, the only plans in which Telus and Bell charge per message (either outgoing or incoming) are pay-per-use prepaid plans. All monthly rate plans include at least unlimited text messaging to numbers within Canada. Additionally in a 2014 press release, Telus stated that charges elicited from unwanted spam text messages can be waived at the customer's request.

Philanthropy 
From 2008 to 2011 inclusively, Telus Mobility sold pink BlackBerry phones where a portion of each sale would support breast cancer research.  This included the BlackBerry Curve and the BlackBerry Pearl consumer models. In 2012, Telus introduced a new campaign entitled "$25 for Free the Children" to replace the breast cancer campaign.  For every purchase of the Samsung Galaxy S III or the Samsung Galaxy Ace Q, TELUS will donate $25 to Free the Children, up to a maximum of $650,000.  Both phones include a We Day-themed gel skin to fit the respective phone purchased.

Retail presence 

Telus Mobility has its own corporate retail stores and also allows third parties to become exclusive dealers. Best Buy, Walmart and selected Loblaws stores in Canada provide Telus products, prepaid and/or postpaid services.

The Loblaws PC Telecom mobile virtual network operator repackages a mix of Bell prepaid and Telus postpaid services; some stores also offer handsets and prepaid minutes under the original network banners.

See also 
 Amp'd Mobile Canada, a defunct youth-targeted brand based on a Telus Mobility partnership in 2007
 Koodo Mobile, an active mobile virtual network operator for this demographic launched solely by Telus Mobility in 2008
 Clearnet Communications, a company that Telus Mobility acquired in 2000
 Mike, a former division of Telus Mobility previously owned by Clearnet selling push-to-talk, military certified phones
 Clearnet, a mobile virtual network operator launched in 2011 by Telus Mobility using the Clearnet brand name
 List of Canadian mobile phone companies
 Telus Communications, the parent of Telus Mobility
 Telus Corporation, parent of Telus Communications

References

External links 
 Official website

Telus
Mobile phone companies of Canada
Telecommunications companies established in 1983
1983 establishments in Alberta